The Golden Girls: Their Greatest Moments is a 2003 American television special that reunited the cast of the 1985–1992 sitcom The Golden Girls. It originally aired on Lifetime on June 2, 2003.

Summary
Bea Arthur, Rue McClanahan and Betty White reunite to co-host a retrospective of The Golden Girls. Estelle Getty, who had retired from show business, was unable to participate due to failing health.

The special features a montage of clips from the women's favorite episodes and musical moments from the show, never-before-seen bloopers and outtakes, behind-the-scenes footage, as well as interviews with executive producers Paul Junger Witt and Tony Thomas, and creator/writer Susan Harris.

The women also introduce clips focused on their individual characters and comment on their character's specific traits and quirks. During the special, Bea Arthur pays tribute to late actor Herb Edelman, who played the recurring role of her character's ex-husband Stanley Zbornak during the series' seven-year run. A new version of the show's theme song "Thank You for Being a Friend" was recorded for this special.

Cast

Principal cast
 Bea Arthur
 Rue McClanahan
 Betty White

Guest stars
 Paul Junger Witt
 Tony Thomas
 Susan Harris

Reception
The Golden Girls: Their Greatest Moments became the highest-rated special in Lifetime network's 19-year history, averaging a 3.7 household rating (4.2 million viewers) during its premiere on June 2, 2003; the second was The Designing Women Reunion which scored a 3.1 rating with 3.3 million viewers when it aired the following month.

The six-hour "Golden Girls" event on Lifetime from 6:00 p.m. to 12 midnight, which included the 90-minute reunion special, the pilot episode, the one-hour series finale and additional favorite episodes of The Golden Girls, was seen by an estimated 15 million viewers.

Lifetime subsequently rebroadcast the special on December 15, 2003 and again on November 12, 2005 to commemorate the show's 20th anniversary.

References

External links

The Golden Girls
2003 television specials
2000s American television specials
Television series reunion specials
English-language television shows
Lifetime (TV network) films
Films directed by Andrew Solt